Nenad Šalov (born 6 October 1955 in Split, SFR Yugoslavia) is a Croatian retired midfielder who played for SFR Yugoslavia.

International career
Šalov made his debut and played his only match for Yugoslavia in a November 1980 World Cup qualification match against Italy.

Honours

Yugoslav First League:
 1973–74, 1974–75, 1978–79

Yugoslav Cup:
 1974, 1975–76, 1976–77, 1983–84

References

External links
 
Profile at Serbian federation site
Arhiva Hajdukovih utakmica

1955 births
Living people
Footballers from Split, Croatia
Association football utility players
Association football midfielders
Association football defenders
Yugoslav footballers
Yugoslavia international footballers
HNK Hajduk Split players
Viktoria Aschaffenburg players
SV Darmstadt 98 players
1. FSV Mainz 05 players
Yugoslav First League players
2. Bundesliga players
Oberliga (football) players
Yugoslav expatriate footballers
Expatriate footballers in West Germany
Yugoslav expatriate sportspeople in West Germany
Croatian football managers
Viktoria Aschaffenburg managers
SV Babelsberg 03 managers
Croatian expatriate football managers
Expatriate football managers in Germany
Croatian expatriate sportspeople in Germany